Hellraiser is a 1987 British supernatural horror film written and directed by Clive Barker, and produced by Christopher Figg, based on Barker's 1986 novella The Hellbound Heart. The film marked Barker's directorial debut. Its plot involves a mystical puzzle box that summons the Cenobites, a group of extra-dimensional, sadomasochistic beings who cannot differentiate between pain and pleasure. The leader of the Cenobites is portrayed by Doug Bradley, and identified in the sequels as "Pinhead".

Hellraiser was filmed in late 1986. Barker originally wanted the electronic music group Coil to perform the music for the film, but on insistence from producers, the film was re-scored by Christopher Young. Some of Coil's themes were reworked by Young into the final score. Hellraiser had its first public showing at the Prince Charles Cinema on 10 September 1987. The film grossed $14.6 million.

Since its release, the film has divided critics but generally received praise; initial reviews ranged from Melody Maker calling it the greatest horror film made in Britain, to Roger Ebert decrying its "bankruptcy of imagination". It was followed by nine sequels, the first seven of which featured Bradley reprising his role as Pinhead. A franchise reboot, also titled Hellraiser, was released in 2022.

Plot

In Morocco, Frank Cotton, a hedonist, buys a puzzle box said to open the door to a realm of otherworldly pleasure. At home in his bare attic, Frank solves the puzzle and hooked chains emerge, tearing him apart. A black-robed figure resets the puzzle and the room is restored back to normal.

Later, Frank's brother Larry moves into the same house. He intends to rebuild his relationship with his second wife, Julia. Larry is unaware that Julia had an affair with Frank before her marriage to him. When Larry accidentally cuts his hand moving furniture, his blood drips on the attic floor and resurrects Frank in a ghoulish form. Julia later finds Frank; still obsessed with him, she agrees to help restore his body, so they can run away together. Julia picks up men in bars and brings them back to the attic, where she mortally wounds them. Frank then drains their life, which regenerates his body. Frank explains to Julia that, having exhausted all sensory experiences, he sought out the puzzle box, which was supposed to provide access to a realm of new carnal pleasures. When the puzzle was solved, the "Cenobites" came to subject him to extreme sadomasochism.

Kirsty, Larry's teenage daughter, sees Julia bringing a man to the house and follows her to the attic, where she finds Frank. She evades Frank and escapes with the puzzle box, collapsing shortly after. Awakening in a hospital, Kirsty solves the box out of curiosity, and unknowingly summons the Cenobites and a monster called the Engineer, which she narrowly escapes from. The Cenobites' leader (referred to by fans as "Pinhead") explains that although they have been perceived as both angels and demons, they are simply "explorers" from another dimension seeking carnal experiences, and they can no longer differentiate between pain and pleasure. When they attempt to force Kirsty to return to their realm with them, she informs Pinhead that Frank has escaped them. The Cenobites agree to spare Kirsty and re-capture Frank instead, with the condition that Frank must confess to escaping them.

Kirsty returns home, where Frank has killed Larry and has taken on his identity by wearing his skin. Julia shows her what is purported to be Frank's flayed corpse in the attic. Kirsty then leaves the attic, locking the door behind her. The Cenobites appear and, not fooled by the deception, demand the man who "did this". Kirsty tries to escape, but is held by Julia and Frank. Frank reveals his true identity to Kirsty and, when his sexual advances are rejected, he decides to kill her to complete his rejuvenation. He accidentally stabs Julia instead and drains her without remorse. Frank chases Kirsty to the attic and, when he is about to kill her, the Cenobites appear after hearing him confess to killing her father. Now certain he is the one they are looking for, they ensnare him with chains with hooks and tear him to pieces. Ripping the puzzle box from Julia's dead hands, Kirsty banishes the Cenobites by reversing the motions needed to open the puzzle box. Kirsty's boyfriend Steve arrives and they both escape the collapsing house.

Afterward, Kirsty throws the puzzle box onto a burning pyre. A vagrant who has been stalking Kirsty walks into the fire and retrieves the box before transforming into a winged skeleton-like creature and flying away. The box ends up with the same merchant who sold it to Frank, where he offers it to another customer.

Cast

Cenobites
Cenobites are extra-dimensional beings who appear in the novella The Hellbound Heart, the sequels The Scarlet Gospels and Hellraiser: The Toll, and the eleven Hellraiser films. They are from a religious sect in Hell known as the Order of the Gash, describing themselves as "explorers in the further regions of experience", and granting sadomasochistic pleasures to those who call upon them. Author David McWilliam notes that the Cenobites are described in more explicitly sexual terms in the book compared with their depictions in the film adaptations. Julia, played by Clare Higgins, was Barker's choice to carry the series as its main antagonist after Hellbound, reducing the Cenobites to a background role. However, fans rallied around Pinhead as the breakout character, and Higgins declined to return to the series. In The Ashgate Encyclopedia of Literary and Cinematic Monsters, David McWilliam writes that the Cenobites "provide continuity across the series, as the stories become increasingly stand-alone in nature".

Production
Having been dismayed at prior cinematic adaptations of his work, Barker decided to attempt to direct a film himself. Christopher Figg agreed to produce and New World Pictures agreed to fund the film for $900,000.

Hellraiser was filmed at the end of 1986 and was set to be made in seven weeks, but was extended over a nine- to ten-week period by New World. The film was originally made under the working title of Sadomasochists from Beyond the Grave. Barker also wanted to call the film Hellbound but producer Christopher Figg suggested Hellraiser instead. Barker spoke fondly in The Hellraiser Chronicles about the filming, stating that his memories of production were of "unalloyed fondness ... The cast treated my ineptitudes kindly, and the crew were no less forgiving". Barker admitted his own lack of knowledge on filmmaking, stating that he "didn't know the difference between a 10-millimetre lens and a 35-millimetre lens. If you'd shown me a plate of spaghetti and said that was a lens, I might have believed you". After filming, New World convinced Barker to relocate the story to the United States which required overdubbing to remove some English accents.

During production, Doug Bradley had trouble hitting his marks during his takes in make-up as he could not see through his black contact lenses and was afraid of tripping over Pinhead's skirts. The special effects of the unnamed creature, known as "The Engineer" in the novels, proved challenging as the creature was difficult to manoeuvre. Other issues included a rushed shoot of the Chinese restaurant scene with Kirsty and Larry, due to the lateness of the person responsible for letting the cast and crew into the establishment. Numerous props of Lemarchand's box, constructed from wood and cut-out brass, were produced by special effects designer and maker Simon Sayce; due to the box's delicate construction, Sayce would lie on the floor under the Cenobites during some takes in case it was dropped, in order to save himself the eight hours it took to create another.

The film had two editors: Richard Marden and an uncredited Tony Randel.

Censorship
Clive Barker had to make some cuts on the film after the MPAA originally gave it an X rating. Two and a half shots were excised from the first hammer murder, including a closeup of the hammer lodged in the victim's head. In the scene where Julia murders another man, the actor playing the victim felt that it made sense for him to do so naked. The nude murder scene was shot but, ultimately, replaced with a semi-clothed version. Close-ups of Kirsty sticking her hand into Frank's stomach, exposing his guts, a longer version of the scene where Frank is being torn into pieces, and the final shot where his head explodes were also cut.

In an interview for Samhain magazine in July 1987, Barker mentioned some problems that censors had with more erotic scenes in the film:

Barker also said that the seduction scene between Julia and Frank was initially a lot more explicit: "We did a version of this scene which had some spanking in it and the MPAA was not very appreciative of that. Lord knows where the spanking footage is. Somebody has it somewhere ... The MPAA told me I was allowed two consecutive buttock thrusts from Frank but three is deemed obscene!"

Soundtrack

Barker originally wanted the electronic music group Coil to perform the music for the film, but that notion was rejected by New World. Editor Tony Randel then suggested Christopher Young as a replacement for Coil for the film's score. Young had previously composed scores for other horror films such as the 1985 slasher A Nightmare on Elm Street 2: Freddy's Revenge and the 1986 Tobe Hooper film Invaders from Mars.

The score for Hellraiser was released in 1987. AllMusic stated that the score proved that Christopher Young "hadn't used up all of his ideas for the horror genre" and that Young had matched "Barker's stylish look with a gothic score that mixed in exciting synthesizer effects". The music that Coil had recorded as a demo for their version of the score was later released as The Unreleased Themes for Hellraiser.

Release
Hellraiser had its first public showing at the Prince Charles Cinema on 10 September 1987. The film was released in the United States on 18 September; it grossed $14,564,000 in the United States and Canada. It made £763,412 in the UK.

Hellraiser was initially banned in Ontario by the Ontario Film and Video Review Board. By a 3-2 majority vote, the film was deemed "not approved in its entirety as it contravenes community standards". It was banned because of its "brutal, graphic violence with blood-letting throughout, horror, degradation and torture". In August 1987, Hellraiser was passed by the Ontario Film Review Board, but only after several cuts were made to the film. New World Mutual Pictures of Canada cut about 40 seconds to get the film passed with an R rating. Thirty-five seconds of an extended torture scene featuring hooks pulling apart a body and face were removed, as well as a scene of squirming rats nailed to a wall.

Critical response
For contemporary reviews in the United Kingdom, Time Out London referred to the film as "Barker's dazzling debut" that "creates such an atmosphere of dread that the astonishing set-pieces simply detonate in a chain reaction of cumulative intensity" and concluded that the film was "a serious, intelligent and disturbing horror film". The Daily Telegraph stated that "Barker has achieved a fine degree of menace". Melody Maker described it as "the best horror film ever to be made in Britain". Kim Newman writing for the Monthly Film Bulletin noted that the most immediately striking aspect of the movie is its seriousness of tone in an era when horror films (the Nightmare on Elm Street or Evil Dead films in particular) tend to be broadly comic". Newman stated that the film "suffers from a few minor compromises: notably a decision made fairly late in shooting to change the specifically English setting for an ambiguous (and unbelievable) mid-Atlantic one". Newman also noted that the Cenobites were "well used suggestive figures" but "their monster companion is a more blunderingly obvious concession to the gross-out tastes of the teenage drive-in audience". Newman concluded that the film was "a return to the cutting edge of horror cinema" and that in more gruesome moments the film "is a reminder of the grand guignol intensity that has recently tended to disintegrate into lazy splatter". Q stated that "Hellraiser does have its share of problems: the re-dubbing of peripheral character with a mid-Atlantic twang, the relocation of the film in a geographical limbo [...] The film, however, cannot be faulted for the ambitiousness of its themes [...] Sadly the moral and emotional complexity that is the film's greatest strength is likely to be deemed its greatest weakness by an audience weaned on the misplaced jocularity of House or Fright Night".

In the United States, The New York Times stated that Barker cast "singularly uninteresting actors" while "the special effects aren't bad - only damp". The Washington Post referred to the film as a "dark, frequently disturbing and occasionally terrifying film" but also argued that "Barker's vision hasn't quite made the conversion from paper to celluloid [...] There are some weaknesses, particularly the framing of close-ups and the generic score, but there are some moments of genuinely inventive gore [...] the film falls apart at its climax, degenerating to a surprisingly lame ending full of special effects and triumphant good". Roger Ebert gave the film one-half of a star out of four and deemed it "as dreary a piece of goods as has masqueraded as horror in many a long, cold night. This is one of those movies you sit through with mounting dread, as the fear grows inside of you that it will indeed turn out to be feature length" and that "this is a movie without wit, style or reason, and the true horror is that actors were made to portray, and technicians to realize, its bankruptcy of imagination". Variety stated that Hellraiser is "well made, well acted, and the visual effects are generally handled with skill".

On the review aggregator website Rotten Tomatoes, Hellraiser holds a 70% approval rating based on 53 critic reviews, with an average rating of 6.5/10. The consensus reads: "Elevated by writer-director Clive Barker's fiendishly unique vision, Hellraiser offers a disquieting - and sadistically smart - alternative to mindless gore". In the early 2010s, Time Out conducted a poll with several authors, directors, actors and critics who have worked within the horror genre to vote for their top horror films. Hellraiser placed at number 80 on their top 100 list.

Home media
In North America, Hellraiser has been released by Anchor Bay Entertainment three times, all of which are the original 93-minute version of the film (this is the only version to ever be released on DVD). The original DVD release was a "barebones" release and is now out of print. It was reissued in 2000 with a new 5.1 mix mastered in THX. Finally, it was packaged along with Hellbound: Hellraiser II in a Limited Edition tin case which included a 48-page colour booklet and a reproduction theatrical poster for both films. Anchor Bay released the film on Blu-ray in 2009. This version retains all of the special features found on the 20th anniversary special edition DVD. In 2011, the film was re-released on Blu-ray by Image Entertainment under the "Midnight Madness" series label. This version contains no special features. However, various Blu-ray releases have since emerged with a highly variable selection of special features, although most of these are recycled from previous DVD releases.

In October 2015, Arrow Films released the film on Blu-ray in the UK along with Hellbound: Hellraiser II and Hellraiser III: Hell on Earth in a Scarlet Box edition featuring new 2K restorations and extensive list of bonus features including feature-length documentaries on the first 2 films and a bonus disc containing additional content such as 2 short films by Clive Barker. The Scarlet Box is now out of print in the UK and replaced by a 3-film edition of the set without the bonus disc.

A US version of the Scarlet Box (with the same material) was released by Arrow on 20 December 2016.

30th Anniversary
In celebration of the 30th anniversary of the film, Clive Barker has adapted his early "Hell Priest" concept designs for the Lead Cenobite into an officially licensed mask for Composite Effects. Only a limited quantity of thirty of these masks were made and then released to the public on 24 March 2017. As part of the Anniversary, Hellraiser was re-released via Blu-Ray in a Steelbook edition on 30 October. It additionally received a theatrical screening at the Prince Charles Cinema, where it made its world premiere in 1987. A remixed and remastered version of Christopher Young's score was also made available, debuting at the Anniversary screening.

Remake

Dimension Films' remake of Hellraiser was announced in November 2006.

In October 2007, French filmmakers Julien Maury and Alexandre Bustillo were announced to write and direct the remake. This version would also not come to fruition. In 2011 the duo discussed with Collider the reasons that ultimately led to their departure from the project. As Maury related: "The problem was that we couldn't agree on the script with the studio. It's kind of obvious why. We are hardcore fans of the original and we wanted to be respectful to Clive Barker's universe. Without his greenlight, we never would have done it. We wouldn't have even considered it. But Bob Weinstein of course had his own vision of the movie and wants to have a movie that can appeal to the largest possible audience...For us, it wasn't possible to make something that could be both".

French director Pascal Laugier was set to direct the film but was later taken off the project due to creative differences with the producers; Laugier wanted his film to be a very serious take whereas the producers wanted the film to be more commercial and appeal to a teen audience.

Patrick Lussier and Todd Farmer were hired to direct and write, respectively, the reboot of Hellraiser in October 2010. The film's story would differ from the original film, as Lussier and Farmer did not want to retell the original story out of respect for Clive Barker's work. The film was to instead focus on the world and function of the puzzle box. Lussier and Farmer dismissed the notion of a teen-oriented Hellraiser film, stating "if we do Hellraiser, it's rated R; if they want to do PG-13 then they have to get rid of us". In 2011, Farmer confirmed that both he and Lussier were no longer attached to the project.

In October 2013, Clive Barker posted on his official Facebook page that he would be personally writing the remake of the original Hellraiser and that he had already completed a deal with Dimension Films' Bob Weinstein. He also stated that he would be pushing for practical effects rather than CGI and the original Pinhead actor Doug Bradley would be reprising the role. Later in March 2017, Clive Barker revealed that the film had not moved forward: "The script was written and delivered to Dimension years ago. That was the last anyone heard until news of Hellraiser: Judgment surfaced".

After the successful release of the 2018 horror sequel Halloween, Miramax Films confirmed that it was considering beginning production on new installments to the Hellraiser franchise. By May 2019, Spyglass Media Group began in developing a new remake of Hellraiser and to be written and co-produced by David S. Goyer. David Bruckner was brought to direct a remake, with Ben Collins and Luke Piotrowski writing the script.

In May 2021, Hulu had acquired the remake for their streaming service. Odessa A'zion was cast as the protagonist, while Jamie Clayton plays Pinhead. Other cast members include Brandon Flynn, Goran Višnjić, Drew Starkey, Adam Faison, Aoife Hinds, Selina Lo and Hiam Abbass. Clive Barker is the film's producer. The film was released in October 2022.

See also
List of British films of 1987
List of horror films of 1987

Notes

References

Citations

Bibliography

External links

                    
                                
           
 

Hellraiser films
1980s American films
1980s British films
1980s English-language films
1980s supernatural horror films
1987 directorial debut films
1987 films
1987 horror films
BDSM in films
British body horror films
British exploitation films
British splatter films
British supernatural horror films
Censored films
Demons in film
Films about father–daughter relationships
Films based on horror novels
Films based on works by Clive Barker
Films directed by Clive Barker
Films scored by Christopher Young
Films set in London
Films shot at Pinewood Studios
Fratricide in fiction
Incest in film
New World Pictures films
Resurrection in film
Splatterpunk
Torture in films